Medical respite care, also referred to as recuperative care, is acute and post-acute medical care for homeless persons who are too ill or frail to recover from a physical illness or injury on the streets but are not ill enough to be in a hospital.

Unlike “respite” for caregivers, “medical respite” is short-term residential care that allows homeless individuals the opportunity to rest in a safe environment while accessing medical care and other supportive services. Medical respite programs provide hospitals with an alternative to discharging homeless patients to the streets or to unequipped shelters when patients would otherwise be discharged to their homes for self-care and recuperation. In addition to providing post-acute care and clinical oversight, medical respite programs seek to improve transitional care for this population and end the cycle of homelessness by supporting patients in access benefits and housing.

As of 2014, over 70 medical respite programs have been established across the United States and a number are in development. Medical respite programs are housed in a number of different facility types including homeless shelters, motel rooms, nursing facilities, assisted living facilities and stand-alone facilities. The largest facility is based out of Boston, Massachusetts (United States), called the Barbara McIinnis House, which has 104 beds for men and women in need of a safe place to recuperate after leaving a hospital. The national average length of stay in medical respite programs is 40 days (30 days median).

Studies and discussion about medical respite care include works on an individual  and program level. A study out of Chicago looking at the impact of medical respite care on future hospitalizations found that patients who accessed medical respite care required fewer hospital stays (3.7 vs. 8.3 days) in the 12-months after program participation than those discharged from the hospital to the street or shelter. Another study out of Boston found similar results with homeless patients requiring 50% fewer hospital readmissions in the 90-days following medical respite program participation than those released to their own care (the street or shelter).  Medical respite care has been discussed in the American Medical New Ethics Forum.

Medical respite care is listed as a strategy in the federal plan to prevent and end homelessness. The Center for Medicare and Medicaid Innovation is currently conducting a national demonstration program to assess the impact of medical respite care. The demonstration is supported by the Affordable Care Act as an effort to improve health outcomes and health care quality while reducing health care spending for this population.

The National Health Care for the Homeless Council maintains a Respite Care Providers' Network of over 700 providers, consumers, and advocates who seek to improve access to medical respite care for homeless individuals across the country.

References 

Types of health care facilities